Polžanska Vas is a small village southwest of Sladka Gora in the Municipality of Šmarje pri Jelšah in eastern Slovenia. The area belongs to the traditional region of Styria. Since 2007 the municipality has been included in the Savinja Statistical Region.

References

External links
Polžanska Vas at Geopedia

Populated places in the Municipality of Šmarje pri Jelšah